Mount Zion Baptist Church is a historic church at 900 Cross Street in Little Rock, Arkansas.  It is a buff brick structure with modest Prairie School features on its exterior, with a three-part facade articulated by brick pilasters, and a trio of entrances set in the center section above a raised basement.  The interior of the church is extremely elaborate in its decoration, with a pressed-metal ceiling, elaborate central copper light fixture, and banks of stained glass windows.  The church was built in 1926 for a predominantly African-American congregation founded in 1877.

The building was listed on the National Register of Historic Places in 1987.

See also
National Register of Historic Places listings in Little Rock, Arkansas

References

Baptist churches in Arkansas
Churches on the National Register of Historic Places in Arkansas
Prairie School architecture in Arkansas
Churches completed in 1926
Churches in Little Rock, Arkansas
National Register of Historic Places in Little Rock, Arkansas